Sir Alexander Cadwallader Mainwaring Spearman (2 March 1901 – 5 April 1982) was a British Conservative Member of Parliament (MP).

His father, who was a Commander in the Royal Navy and commanded a battalion of a Royal Naval Brigade in the First World War, was killed in action in the Dardanelles Campaign.

Alexander was educated at Repton and Hertford College, Oxford, where he was in receipt of a scholarship for descendants of Sir Francis Baring. After Oxford, he became a stockbroker, and in 1941 he was elected to Parliament as a Conservative in a by-election for the seat of Scarborough and Whitby. He had earlier failed to be elected at Gorton and Mansfield. He held his seat in every election until 1966 when he retired.

In 1951 to 1952 he was Parliamentary Private Secretary to the President of the Board of Trade. In 1956 he was knighted. A former governor of the London School of Economics, he spoke frequently in the House of Commons on financial and economic issues.

He was married twice and had five children. He married Diana, his first wife, in 1928; they were divorced in 1951, in which year he married his second wife, also called Diana. His first wife contested Poplar South in the 1935 general election, failing to be elected in what was a safe Labour seat. She contested Kingston upon Hull Central in the 1945 general election, again failing to be elected.

His grandson Alexander James Spearman (born 1984) married in 2014 Dona Amelia de Orléans e Bragança, daughter of Dom Antônio de Orléans e Bragança, a descendant of the former Brazilian imperial family, and his wife Princess Christine de Ligne, a member of the Belgian aristocracy.

See also
Spearman Baronets

References
The Times, Obituary, 6 April 1982

External links 
 

1901 births
1982 deaths
Knights Bachelor
People educated at Repton School
Alumni of Hertford College, Oxford
British stockbrokers
Royal Navy officers
Conservative Party (UK) MPs for English constituencies
UK MPs 1935–1945
UK MPs 1945–1950
UK MPs 1950–1951
UK MPs 1951–1955
UK MPs 1955–1959
UK MPs 1959–1964
UK MPs 1964–1966
Politicians from Scarborough, North Yorkshire
20th-century British businesspeople